The Sukhamoy Chakravarty Committee was formed in December 1982 under the chairmanship of Prof. Sukhamoy Chakroborty to assess the functioning of the Indian Monetary system. Its goal was to improve monetary regulation, a feat that was hoped would enable price stability. The committee, which submitted its report in April 1985, believed that price stability was essential for promoting growth and achieving other social objectives.

Background 
During the 1970s and early 1980s, the Indian economy had numerous issues relating to the functioning of the monetary system. The government borrowing program was increasing rapidly. These increasing requirements from the government could be met by a) Increasing credit from the Reserve Bank of India to the government and b) Increasing the Statutory Liquidity Ratio that was meant to be maintained by the banks. As a result, the reserves of the government were increasing and this led to an increase in the Money Supply which in turn, resulted in inflationary pressures in the economy.  The Reserve Requirement was increased from time to time to counter the effect of this increase in money supply due to the Reserve Bank of India's decision to finance the deficit of the government. These were the most prominent reasons for the appointment of the Chakravarty Committee for reviewing the monetary system. As Chakravarty himself stated, his analysis of the monetary system was to be done "from the point of view of ensuring non inflationary planned development in the years to come."

Recommendations of the committee

Monetary targeting 
Monetary targeting essentially refers to fixing ex ante the most favorable target rate of growth of Money Supply as the foundation of the policy of monetary regulation. This was one of the most important recommendations due to the fact that price stability is influenced significantly by the growth of Money Supply, even though it is not the only factor; it can be affected by several other non monetary factors as well.
The committee stated that an average increase of no more than 4% per year in the Wholesale Price Index should be treated as acceptable. However, annual inflation was 8%, 9% and 10% during the 1970s, 1980s, and 1990s(1990–1995) respectively. The committee did not share the same view on Monetary Targeting as was practiced in countries around the world. It did not believe in setting rigid targets. Monetary targeting for them was more of an inflexible rule which had to be constantly changed depending on factors in the economy, such as growth etc. Optimally, the growth of money supply should be adapted to the expected growth in the Demand for money associated with the expected growth in Real income at stable prices. This implies that the target rate of growth of money supply requires

a) To project the rate of growth of real output.

b) To estimate the real Income elasticity of demand for Real Money.

The product of the above should give the optimal target rate of growth of money supply.

The Chakravarty committee however, did not use target the growth of money supply in the way mentioned above. It did not put forward any estimate of the income elasticity of demand. Furthermore, the committee had advocated a range for growth of money supply rather than any target value. It did not mention an average annual rate over a longer period, (of say, 5 years) and not a maximum rate either.
In its anxiousness to impart sufficient flexibility to Monetary Policy, the committee had recommended that even the target range for the growth of money supply will be subject to revisions during the year in the light of emerging trends in output and prices. It referred to such flexible monetary targeting as monetary targeting with feedback. This, however, has been excessively criticized as people believed that too much short period fine tuning of the monetary system should be avoided and the emphasis should be on ensuring long term monetary stability. The committee's point of view was that this method of monetary targeting "would bind the Reserve Bank and the Government of India in a common effort to achieve the desired growth in money supply."

Two other features of the design of Monetary Policy by the committee:
 With the committee, M3 is the favored measure of M, and not M1. It did not give any basis for this preference. M3 is a broader measure of money supply than M1.
 Though the committee accepted the H(or the money multiplier) theory of money supply and the empirical judgement and evidence that the money multiplier in India is highly stable, it did not exploit systematically and fully, the crucial role of H and of the sources of changes in H in the formulation of monetary and credit policy......(money and financial markets)

Credit budgeting 
The second main component of the restructured monetary system of the committee's conception is credit budgeting. The objectives of the credit budget are to determine,
 "The permissible level of bank credit to the commercial sector."
Having determined the monetary target for the next year, the incremental bank credit for all the sectors can be determined using this target as well as the currency deposit ratio. Having determined the target for M3. there is no freedom left with the monetary authority to determine bank credit as it is co-determined with M3, though banks may vary the bank credit within a narrow band by varying other resources.

The amount of incremental bank credit for the commercial will then be determined residually by taking out the share of bank credit going into Government securities and other Securities. Such investment will be given by the prevailing Statutory Liquidity Ratio and the total net liabilities of banks.

 "A broad profile of the sectoral deployment of credit."
This relates only to the deployment of Credit within the commercial sector, as the credit within the Commercial sector, as the credit going to the government as the credit going to the government and other securities as already been approved earlier. Here, the committee has said the following 3 things:
 In the credit budget, the sectoral allocation of credit is determined in the light of Plan priorities.
 If M3 is revised in the course of the year due to output trends and the behavior of prices, the credit budget will also be appropriately modified.
 The credit budget for the commercial sector should be compared with the estimates of demand for such credit.

Flexible interest rates 
The third component of the scheme of monetary regulation recommended by the committee and which marks an important departure from the prevailing Monetary Policy practice in India relates to significant relaxations in the prevailing system of administered rates of Interest. The committee does not support the idea of pricing Credit too low for both the government and the commercial borrowers in public or Private Sector. This is attributable to the fact that low rates of Interest, encourages too much monetisation of Government debt, leaves too little for the Reserve Bank of India's refinance of banks, discourages effective use of Credit by borrowers, discourages financial savings and reduces profitability of Banks and other Financial institutions.

Hence, the committee suggested an upward revision of several rates of interest, both, for attracting deposits and for lending to commercial borrowers. The recommendations of the committee with regard to Interest rates were discussed under the 3 main heads:
 Interest Rates and the expected rate of Inflation (Pe)
 Interest Rates on government securities.
 Interest Rates on deposits and loans of banks.

Interest rates and the expected rate of Inflation (Pe) 
The committee linked the interest rates with the Rate of Inflation. This draws upon Irving Fisher's hypothesis about the relation between money and real rates of Interest which states that in a risk free world,

i = r + pe,

where i = money rate of interest and
r = real rate of interest.

The committee's recommendation focused on translating this equation into actual practice. It suggested from its own side what the target r the Reserve Bank of India should aim at for a particular administered i. It would also estimate the appropriate Pe ; short term or long term as required. Using these values will give the appropriate value of i.

Interest rates on government securities 
The Government of India borrows funds through Treasury Bills and marketable debt of medium and long term maturities. Of these, more than 90% of the T Bills and more than 30% of dated securities were held by the Reserve Bank of India. Since the RBI has been the major captive holder of these securities, they managed to keep the rate of interest fixed at a low rate of 4.6% per annum since 1974 until around 1982–1983. The low rates had dried the voluntary demand for Government Securities.
The committee's chief recommendation was for the upward revision of these rates. This was done to encourage competition with other rates in the open market which in turn would attract enough voluntary investment in government securities.

The criterion of revision was stated in terms of
a)The real rate of interest,
b)the expected rate of price inflation

The recommendation structure of nominal interest rates is given below:

For other maturities, the real rate may vary between 1% and 3% p.a. The committee also advised that the maturity should not be more than 15 years as it is hard for the capital market to form price expectations beyond 15 years.

The chief motivation for the upward revision of the yield structure of government securities is derived from the committee's concern for successive annual increase in H(High Powered Money) which is a consequence of excess dependence on the Reserve Bank of India credit to meet its fiscal deficit. The outcome of this increase in 'H' is an increase in M through the money multiplier process. This increase in M is relative to real output, hence putting inflationary pressures in the economy and threatening price stability.

View on T-bills 
 It should serve as the ideal short term paper in the money market and must be developed as an active monetary instrument.
 For this to be possible, the yield on T Bills should be raised substantially.
 T Bills must be used only to meet the unanticipated short term Budget Deficit and not as a cheap source of long term funds for the government in place of long term market loans, as has been the practice for long.

The committee's recommended solution was much greater reliance on open market borrowing. The committee hoped that through competitive rates of interest, security and liquidity in comparison with private corporate securities, the public would be attracted to the government securities.

Deposit and lending rate of banks 
The committee's key recommendations on these rates were:

 Deposits of maturity greater than 5 years should have a deposit rate which must be fixed at long term Ṗe + a positive real ' r ' not less than 2% p.a.
 One year deposit rate should be marginally positive in real terms. This implies that it should equal the short term, i.e. one year  Ṗe + a small positive real ' r '.
 Other deposit rates with varying maturity between 1 and 5 years should be left to be fixed by the banks within the limits of the above 2 rates.
 The rate of interest on saving deposits should stay at 5% p.a.

These rates must be fixed by the Reserve Bank of India. The committee however, did not specify how frequently these rates must be changed and if the RBI's price expectations need to be revised when actual prices change differently.

The committee approved fiscal incentives, i.e. tax exemption on interest income from bank deposits up to a stipulated maximum, as this had led to a phenomenal increase in fixed deposits over time. These incentives however, are only for the large income individuals. Small savers could not be benefited from such incentives and the committee did not recommend in this direction.

Lending rate of banks 
 The RBI should set only the minimum lending rate to serve as a floor and leave the rest to market competition among banks. The recommendation was that the lending rate should be fixed 3% higher than the maximum rate of deposits. The maximum rate on deposits was given by:
Ṗe + 2%p.a.
Hence the lending rate should be:
Ṗe + 5% p.a.

Thus, 3% would constitute the 'minimum administered spread' between the Lending rate and the rate on deposits for banks. The actual spread would vary. The committee also opposed any ceiling rate for non concessional loans and advances. All that would introduce what the committee had called 'controlled competition' among banks. This was expected to promote better use of credit by borrowers' and prompt them to improve their Credit rating so as to gain more favorable terms from their bankers, and in turn make bankers more cost and profit conscious and also more responsive to the genuine needs and problems of their consumers.

The committee also tried to regulate the number of concessional rates, i.e. regarding the bank lending to the priority sector. It recommended only 2 concessional rates:
 Basic minimum lending rate.
 The other rate should be determined by the RBI with consultation with the government and slightly below the basic minimum lending rate.
It also recommended that the credit delivery system to the priority sector should be strengthened.

The committee also wished to expand the call money market. Hence, they recommended the removal of the ceiling on the inter-bank cell money rate of 10% p.a.

Criticisms 
The committee was criticized heavily as it was believed that the recommendations would not be able to curb money supply due to the following reasons:
 The committee recommended a range rather than an actual target for the annual grown of Money Supply, M. People opined that this provision is likely to be interpreted liberally by the government and the RBI would concur, hence defeating the purpose. Further flexibility was provided with its system of 'Monetary targeting with feedback'. This would render the target for growth of Money Supply short lived and would dilute further any monetary discipline they wished to achieve.
 The committee had recommended that each of the nominal rates to be administered based on the target real interest and the short term/long term rate of growth of price inflation. The underlying assumption seems to be that thereby actual real 'r' will turn out to be equal to the target real 'r'. Clearly, this would be so only if Ṗ = Ṗe. Error free prediction of Ṗ is not easily realize. Also, the RBI's price expectations may diverge much from the public's price expectations.
 It should have been relatively easier for the RBI to fix the nominal rates on the Term deposits for one year and five years and above and also the basic lending rate for banks. Managing the market for government securities so as to maintain a certain chose interest rate structure and ensure enough voluntary demand for government bonds and bills would not be that easy.
 The committee linked the treasury bills with short term Ṗe and all other rates of interest with long term Ṗe without giving any reason for the same.
 The committee gave no recommendation on how and when the nominal rates of interest should be revised.

See also
Narasimham Committee on Banking Sector Reforms
Economic history of India

References

Financial history of India
Monetary policy